Pumwaree Yodkamol (born February 9, 1982, in Bangkok) is a Thai film and television actress. She co-starred in Ong-Bak: Muay Thai Warrior, portraying Muay Lek alongside Tony Jaa. Other roles include The Bodyguard, where she played Pok, and Pisaj, in the role of Oui.

Yodkamol appears on the Channel 3 (Thailand) variety show In the Dark and other shows.

Selected filmography
Ong-Bak: Muay Thai Warrior (2003) -Muay Lek
The Bodyguard (2004)-Pok
Pisaj (2004)
Tom-Yum-Goong (2005) (girl on the street)

References

External links

1982 births
Living people
Pumwaree Yodkamol
Pumwaree Yodkamol
Pumwaree Yodkamol
Pumwaree Yodkamol